The Fyfe River is a river in the Tasman District of New Zealand. It arises in the Marino Mountains near Mount Owen and flows north, then south-west, south and south-east to join the Owen River, a tributary of the Buller River, which eventually exits into the Tasman Sea.

A Department of Conservation-maintained tramping track follows the river, and can be used for access to Mount Owen.

See also
List of rivers of New Zealand

References

Land Information New Zealand - Search for Place Names

Rivers of the Tasman District
Rivers of New Zealand